Aleksandr Ivanovich Blinov (19 August 1954 – 9 February 2021) was a Russian Soviet equestrian and Olympic champion, born in Frunze, Kirghiz SSR. He won a team gold medal in eventing at the 1980 Summer Olympics in Moscow.

Death
His daughter was in contact with Blinov by telephone on February 9, 2021. He planned to take the bus from Andreyevskoye to Mozhaisk to visit the bank. In the evening, his daughter could not get in contact with him and he was reported missing. Blinov's body was found three weeks later on March 2, 2021. On the evening of February 9, he appears to have been dropped off by a taxi 500m from his house. The taxi couldn't get any closer due to snow.

References

External links

1954 births
2021 deaths
Sportspeople from Bishkek
Kyrgyzstani male equestrians
Soviet male equestrians
Olympic equestrians of the Soviet Union
Equestrians at the 1980 Summer Olympics
Olympic gold medalists for the Soviet Union
Olympic silver medalists for the Soviet Union
Event riders
Olympic medalists in equestrian
Medalists at the 1980 Summer Olympics